Saarland University is a public research university located in Saarbrücken, the capital of the German state of Saarland. It was founded in 1948 in Homburg in co-operation with France and is organized in six faculties that cover all major fields of science.  In 2007, the university was recognized as an excellence center for computer science in Germany.

Thanks to bilingual German and French staff, the university has an international profile, which has been underlined by its proclamation as "European University" in 1950 and by establishment of Europa-Institut as its "crown and symbol" in 1951.

Nine academics have been honored with the highest German research prize, the Gottfried Wilhelm Leibniz Prize, while working at Saarland University.

History 

Saarland University, the first to be established after World War II, was founded in November 1948 with the support of the French Government and under the auspices of the University of Nancy.

At the time the Saarland found itself in the special situation of being partly autonomous and linked to France by economic and monetary union. With its combination of the German and French educational traditions and the dual languages of instruction, the university had a European perspective right from the start. Prior to the foundation of the university, clinical training courses for medical students at the state hospital, Saarland University Hospital, in Homburg, Saarland, had been introduced in January 1946 and the "Centre Universitaire d'Etudes Supérieures de Hombourg" established on 8 May 1947 under the patronage of the University of Nancy. Students in certain disciplines can obtain degree certificates from both universities.

The first president of the independent university in 1948 was Jean Barriol. In the same year the university introduced the first courses in law, philosophy and languages.

In the 1950s Saarland University joined the Association of West-German Universities and accepted a new, more centralized organizational structure, and the Europa-Institut is established as a European politics and law think tank.

Organization and administration 
The university is headed by a board, which includes a president and five vice presidents, responsible for planning and strategy, research and technology transfer, education, and administration and finance, respectively. The president is elected by both the senate and the council in separate votes.

The senate, consisting of nine professors, three students, three academic and two administrative staff members, acts as the legislative branch. Further, the university has a council which makes strategic decisions, allocates funding, and supervises the board. The council's members are representatives of private companies and academic institutions including other universities, in addition to representatives of the university's professors, staff members, and students.

The university is divided into six faculties:
 Faculty of Human and Business Sciences
 Faculty of Medicine
 Faculty of Mathematics and Computer Science
 Faculty of Natural Sciences and Technology
 Faculty of Humanities
 Faculty of Law

Academic profile

Research 
Saarland University is known for research in Computer Science, nano technology, medicine, European relations, politics and law. The university campus and the surrounding area is home to several specialized research institutes, affiliated with various high-profile independent research societies and private companies, focused on primary and applied research.

 Max Planck Institute for Computer Science
 Max Planck Institute for Software Systems
 German Research Centre for Artificial Intelligence – DFKI
 CISPA – Helmholtz Center for Information Security
 Dagstuhl, the Leibniz Center for Informatics
 Fraunhofer IZFP
 Fraunhofer Institute for Biomedical Engineering
 Society for Environmentally Compatible Process Technology
 Institut of the society for the promotion of the applied information research
 Leibniz-Institute for New Materials INM
 KIST – Korea Institute of Science and Technology Europe Research Society.
 Intel Visual Computing Institute
 Centre for Bio-informatics Saar
 Institute for Formal Ontology and Medical Information Science – IFOMIS
 HIPS – Helmholtz Institute for Pharmaceutical Research Saarland

The university science park provides a startup incubator and a technology/research transfer environment for companies mostly focused on IT, nanotechnology and biotechnology.

Education 

With its numerous degree programmes and the variety of final qualifications offered (Diplom, Magister, PhD, state examinations and, increasingly, bachelor and master qualifications), Saarland University provides the broad spectrum of disciplines typical of a classical universitas litterarum. The more traditional subjects such as business administration and economics, law and medicine are just as much a part of Saarland University as the new degree programmes that have developed from modern interdisciplinary collaborations and which reflect the increasing demand for such qualifications in today's job market. Examples of these new courses include 'Biology with Special Focus on Human Biology and Molecular Biology', 'Bioinformatics /Computational Biology', 'Mechatronics Engineering', 'Micro- and Nanostructured Materials', 'Computer and Communications Technology', 'Historically-oriented Cultural Studies' and 'French Cultural Science and Intercultural Communication'.

Integrated degree courses, which can lead to the award of a joint degree, are organized by Saarland University and foreign partner universities in the fields of business administration, physics, chemistry, materials science and in the interdisciplinary programme 'Cross-border Franco-German Studies'. In the area of teacher training, Saarland University offers an integrated bilingual (French-German) course for prospective teachers of geography and history. A further distinctive feature of Saarland University is the fact that the university is able to award French degrees in subjects such as Droit, Allemand and Lettres modernes. Additional qualifications may also be obtained in numerous postgraduate courses.

The Europa-Institut is among the very few socio-economic research centers to focus primarily on European integration. Its European law and MBA in European management programmes uniquely focus on opportunities emerging from an expanding and more integrated Europe.

The university is also responsible for conducting Computer Science related courses for students enrolled in the graduate programmes of the MPI for Computer Science and MPI for Software Systems. Saarland University is one of the few universities in Germany where the entire master's programme in Computer Science is taught in English.

Cooperation 
Saarland University is part of the Software-Cluster, a local association of universities, research institutes and IT companies in Karlsruhe, Darmstadt, Kaiserslautern, Waldorf and Saarbrücken with the purpose of fostering business software development.

Notable people

Leibniz Prize winners 

 Rolf Müller, Biotechnology (2021)
 Joachim Weickert, Digital image processing (2010)
 Hans-Peter Seidel, Computer Graphics (2003)
 Manfred Pinkal, Computational Linguistics (2000)
 Johannes Buchmann, Information Theory (1993)
 Michael Veith, Inorganic Chemistry (1991)
 Herbert Gleiter, Material Science (1989)
 Günter Hotz, Kurt Mehlhorn and Wolfgang Paul, Computer Science (1987)

Alumni 
 David Bardens (born 1984), Physician
 Susanne Albers (born 1965), Scientist
 Peter Altmaier (born 1958), Politician (CDU)
 Karl-Otto Apel (born 1922), Philosopher
 Hans Hermann Hoppe (born 1949), Philosopher and Economist
 Peter Bofinger (born 1954), Economist
 F. Thomas Bruss (born 1949), Mathematician
 Ralf Dahrendorf (1929–2009), Politician
 Lars Feld (born 1966), Economist
 Jürgen W. Falter (born 1944), Political Scientist
 Winfried Hassemer (born 1940), Scientist
Philip Hall (born 1967), British diplomat
 Werner Jeanrond (born 1955), Theologian
 Alexandra Kertz-Welzel (born 1970), Professor of Music Education at LMU Munich
 Reinhard Klimmt (born 1942), Politician (SPD)
 Annegret Kramp-Karrenbauer (born 1962), Politician (CDU)
 Christian Graf von Krockow (1927–2002), Political Scientist and Author
 Daniel Kroening, computer scientist
 Oskar Lafontaine (born 1943), Politician (Linkspartei)
 Wilfried Loth (born 1948), Historian
 Heiko Maas (born 1966), Politician (SPD)
 Werner Maihofer (1918–2009), Lawyer and Politician (FDP)
 Alfred Werner Maurer (born 1945), architecte, archéologue, historien de l'art excavation directeur Mumbaqat Syrie
 Matthias Maurer (born 1980), Materials Scientist and Astronaut
 Bernhard Nebel (born 1956), Scientist
 Anke Rehlinger (born 1976), Politician (SPD)
 August-Wilhelm Scheer (born 1941), Scientist and Entrepreneur
 Claus-Peter Schnorr (born 1943), Scientist
 Ottmar Schreiner (born 1942), Politician (SPD)
 Diana Stöcker (born 1970), Politician (CDU)
 Christina Weiss (born 1953), Journalist and Politician
 Michael Wolffsohn (born 1947), Historian
 Johanna Narten (1930–2019), historical linguist and first woman member of the Bavarian Academy of Sciences and Humanities

Points of interest 

The main campus in Saarbrücken is just outside the city, set between picturesque hills. Cycling from the university to the city or short wander in the forest close to campus is a favorite of students and faculty.

 Botanischer Garten der Universität des Saarlandes, the university's botanical garden
 The Hermann-Neuberger-Sportschule is located next to the campus and hosts the Olympiastützpunkt Rheinland-Pfalz/Saarland that is the Olympic Training Center for Rheinland-Pfalz and Saarland.
 There is also a recreation center called Uni-Fit.

University hospital 

The University Hospital of the Saarland (in German: Universitätsklinikum des Saarlandes or UKS) is the hospital of Saarland University in Homburg, Saarland, Germany.

It is concentrated on a campus south of the city center, with more than 100 clinic buildings scattered across more than 200 hectares of forest. In the course of the project UKS Projekt Zukunft, which was started in 2009, numerous new buildings are being built and the clinics for internal medicine are being combined in a large building complex. Affiliated are the medical faculty of the Saarland University with about 2000 medical students,  and a school center with eleven schools for health professions

See also 
 BALL
 Europa-Institut of Saarland University
 Hochschule für Musik Saar
 Homburg

References

External links 
  

 
Universities and colleges in Saarland
Education in Saarbrücken
Buildings and structures in Saarbrücken
Educational institutions established in 1948
1948 establishments in Germany
1948 establishments in Saar
Universities established in the 1940s